The 1999–2000 Scottish Challenge Cup was the ninth season of the competition, which was also known as the Bell's Challenge Cup for sponsorship reasons. It was competed for by the 30 member clubs of the Scottish Football League. The defending champions were Falkirk, who defeated Queen of the South 1–0 in the 1997 final.

The final was played on 21 November 1999, between Inverness Caledonian Thistle and Alloa Athletic at Excelsior Stadium in Airdrie. Alloa Athletic won 5–4 on penalties after a 4–4 draw after extra time, to win the tournament for the first time in the club's history.

Schedule

First round 
Forfar Athletic and Livingston received random byes into the second round.

Source: Soccerbase

Second round 

Source: Soccerbase

Quarter-finals

Semi-finals

Final

Notes 
A. The 1998–99 tournament was suspended due to lack of sponsorship

References

External links 
 Scottish Football League Scottish Challenge Cup on Scottish Football League website
 ESPN Soccernet  Scottish League Challenge Cup homepage on ESPN Soccernet
 BBC Sport – Scottish Cups Challenge Cup on BBC Sport

Scottish Challenge Cup seasons
Challenge Cup
Scottish Challenge Cup